Martin Chernacov (born 17 October 1965) is a Costa Rican alpine skier. He competed in the men's giant slalom at the 1992 Winter Olympics.

References

1965 births
Living people
Costa Rican male alpine skiers
Olympic alpine skiers of Costa Rica
Alpine skiers at the 1992 Winter Olympics
Place of birth missing (living people)